Beqir Meta is Albanian historian and member of the Academy of Sciences of Albania and director of the Institute of History. He published many works on Greek-Albanian relations. Meta is director of National Historical Museum and president of the Scientific Committee of the Mother Teresa Museum.

References 

20th-century Albanian historians
Members of the Academy of Sciences of Albania
Living people
Year of birth missing (living people)
21st-century Albanian historians